Kevin Luiters (born 2 July 1992) is a South African rugby union player for the  in the Currie Cup.  His regular position is scrum-half.

Career

Youth and Varsity Cup rugby

He represented them in two youth tournaments – at Under-16 level at the 2008 Grant Khomo Week (which led to his inclusion in the South African Under-16 Elite Squad) and at Under-18 level at the 2010 Craven Week (which led to his inclusion in the South African Under-18 High Performance Squad).

Luiters then played for the  team in the 2010 Under-19 Provincial Championship competition and for the  team in the 2012 Under-21 Provincial Championship and 2013 Under-21 Provincial Championship competitions.

Free State Cheetahs

Eastern Province Kings

He signed a contract with the Kings until the end of 2017. In June 2014, he was selected in the starting line-up for the  side to face  during a tour match during a 2014 incoming tour. He made his debut for the Kings, playing the first 53 minutes as the Kings suffered a 12–34 defeat. He appeared as a replacement in the Eastern Province Kings' opening match of the season against  and had an immediate impact, scoring a try five minutes after coming on. However, it proved to be a mere consolation try as Western Province ran out 35–16 winners. He made a total of eight appearances during the 2014 Currie Cup Premier Division, but finished on the losing side in each of those appearances as the Kings finished bottom of the log.

Personal

References

External links

South African rugby union players
Living people
1992 births
Sportspeople from Port Elizabeth
Free State Cheetahs players
South Africa international rugby sevens players
Southern Kings players